In Greek mythology, Antigone is the daughter of Oedipus and either his mother Jocasta or, in another variation of the myth, Euryganeia. She is a sister of Polynices, Eteocles, and Ismene. The meaning of the name is, as in the case of the masculine equivalent Antigonus, "worthy of one's parents" or "in place of one's parents". She appears in the three 5th century BC tragic plays written by Sophocles, known as the three Theban plays, and she is the main protagonist of the eponymous tragedy Antigone.

In Sophocles 

The story of Antigone was addressed by the fifth-century BC Greek playwright Sophocles in his Theban plays:

Oedipus Rex 
Antigone and her sister Ismene are seen at the end of Oedipus Rex as Oedipus laments the "shame" and "sorrow" he is leaving his daughters to. He then begs Creon to watch over them, but in his grief reaches to take them with him as he is led away. Creon prevents him from taking the girls out of the city with him. Neither of them is named in the play.

Oedipus at Colonus 
Antigone serves as her father's guide in Oedipus at Colonus, as she leads him into the city where the play takes place. Antigone resembles her father in her stubbornness and doomed existence. She stays with her father for the majority of the play, until she is taken away by Creon in an attempt to blackmail Oedipus into returning to Thebes. However, Theseus defends Oedipus and rescues both Antigone and her sister who was also taken prisoner.

At the end of the play, both Antigone and her sister mourn the death of their father. Theseus offers them the comfort of knowing that Oedipus has received a proper burial, but by his wishes, they cannot go to the site. Antigone then decides to return to Thebes.

Antigone 
In her own namesake play, Antigone attempts to secure a respectable burial for her brother Polynices. Oedipus's sons, Eteocles and Polynices, had shared rule jointly until they quarreled, and Eteocles expelled his brother. In Sophocles' account, the two brothers agreed to alternate rule each year, but Eteocles decided not to share power with his brother after his tenure expired. Polynices left the kingdom, gathered an army and attacked the city of Thebes in the war of the Seven against Thebes. Both brothers were killed in the battle.

King Creon, who has ascended to the throne of Thebes after the death of the brothers, decrees that Polynices is not to be buried or even mourned, on pain of death by stoning. Antigone, Polynices' sister, defies the king's order and is caught.

Antigone is brought before Creon, and admits that she knew of Creon's law forbidding mourning for Polynices but chose to break it, claiming the superiority of divine over human law, and she defies Creon's cruelty with courage, passion, and determination. Creon orders Antigone buried alive in a tomb. Although Creon has a change of heart and tries to release Antigone, he finds she has hanged herself. Creon's son Haemon, who was in love with Antigone, commits suicide with a knife, and his mother Queen Eurydice also kills herself in despair over her son's death. She had been forced to weave throughout the entire story, and her death alludes to The Fates. By her death Antigone ends up destroying the household of her adversary, Creon.

Other representations 
In the oldest version of the story, the burial of Polynices takes place during Oedipus' reign in Thebes, before Oedipus marries his mother, Jocasta. However, in other versions such as Sophocles' tragedies Oedipus at Colonus and Antigone, it occurs in the years after the banishment and death of Oedipus and Antigone's struggles against Creon.

Seven Against Thebes

Antigone appears briefly in Aeschylus' Seven Against Thebes.

Euripides' lost story 
The dramatist Euripides also wrote a play called Antigone, which is lost, but some of the text was preserved by later writers and in passages in his Phoenissae. In Euripides, the calamity is averted by the intercession of Dionysus and is followed by the marriage of Antigone and Hæmon. Antigone also plays a role in the Phoenissae.

Appearance elsewhere
Different elements of the legend appear in other places. A description of an ancient painting by Philostratus (Imagines ii. 29) refers to Antigone placing the body of Polynices on the funeral pyre, and this is also depicted on a sarcophagus in the Villa Doria Pamphili in Rome. And in Hyginus' version of the legend, apparently founded on a tragedy by a follower of Euripides, Antigone, on being handed over by Creon to her lover Hæmon to be slain, is secretly carried off by him and concealed in a shepherd's hut, where she bears him a son, Maeon. When the boy grows up, he attends some funeral games at Thebes, and is recognized by the mark of a dragon on his body. This leads to the discovery that Antigone is still alive. The demi-god Heracles then intercedes and pleads with Creon to forgive Hæmon, but in vain. Hæmon then kills Antigone and himself. The intercession by Heracles is also represented on a painted vase (circa 380–300 BC).

Genealogy

Gallery

Cultural references

In modern times, Antigone is invoked as a symbol of heroism.

Adaptations 
The story of Antigone has been a popular subject for books, plays, and other works, including:
 Antigone, one of the three extant Theban plays by Sophocles (497 BC406 BC), the most famous adaptation
 Antigone, a play by Euripides (c. 480406 BC) which is now lost except for some fragments
 Antigona, opera by Tommaso Traetta, libretto by Marco Coltellini (1772)
 Antigona, opera by Josef Mysliveček, libretto by Gaetano Roccaforte (1774)
 Antigone (1841), settings of the choruses by Felix Mendelssohn as incidental music for a performance of Johann Jakob Christian Donner's translation of Sophocles
 Antigone, play by Jean Cocteau (1889–1963)
 Antigone, opera by Arthur Honegger (1892–1955), libretto by Jean Cocteau (1889–1963)
 Antigonae (Salzburg 1949), opera by Carl Orff (1895–1982)
 Antigone (1944), play by Jean Anouilh (1910–1987) performed during the Nazi occupation of Paris
 "Antigone-Legend", for soprano and piano (text by Bertolt Brecht), by Frederic Rzewski (1938–2021) and presented as a play in two slightly different versions in 1948 and 1951
 Αντιγόνη (Antigone), ballet by Mikis Theodorakis (b. 1925), 1959
 Αντιγόνη (Antigone), opera by Mikis Theodorakis (b. 1925), 1995–96
 Antigone (1990/1991), opera by Ton de Leeuw (b. 1926)
 Antígona Furiosa (Furious Antigone), play by Griselda Gambaro (b. 1928)
 Another Antigone, play by A. R. Gurney (b. 1930)
 The Island, play by Athol Fugard (b. 1932)
 La Pasión Según Antígona Pérez ((The) Passion according to Antigone Pérez), adaptation by Luis Rafael Sánchez (b. 1936), updated to 20th-century Latin America
 Antígona, play by Salvador Espriu (1939)
 "Antigone", a short story by Sheila Watson (1959)
 Tegonni, An African Antigone by Femi Osofisan (b. 1946)
 Antigone, an adaptation of Sophocles' play by Peruvian poet José Watanabe (b. 1946)
 Antigone, opera by Mark Alburger (b. 1957) 
 Antigone (1961), a film directed by Yorgos Javellas, starring Irene Papas.
 La tumba de Antígona (1967), philosophy work in poetry (razón poética) by María Zambrano (1904–1991)
 Antigone, comic book by David Hopkins (b. 1977)
 Antigone, opera by Vassily Lobanov, libretto by Alexey Parin (1988)
 Antigone by Henry Bauchau
 Antigone's Red (2002), a short play by Chiori Miyagawa
 The Burial at Thebes (2004), by Seamus Heaney, adapted into a 2008 opera with music by Dominique Le Gendre
 Antigone, play by Mac Wellman
 Antígona Vélez (1950), adaptation of Sophocles' play by Argentinean writer Leopoldo Marechal (1900–1970)
 Antigona (1960), a play by Dominik Smole
 Antigonai (2009), opera based on fragments by Sophocles and Hölderlin for three choirs and a women's trio by Argentine composer Carlos Stella
 Antigone's Song (2010), a short post-apocalyptic musical western film based loosely on the myth of Antigone by Perpombellar Productions
 Antigone (1948), by Bertolt Brecht, based on the translation by Friedrich Hölderlin and published under the title Antigonemodell 1948 An English translation of Brecht's version of the play is available
 Antigone, play by Antonio D'Alfonso (2004)
 Antigone, play by Don Taylor
 Antigone, modern adaptation (87 minute film) by Antonio D'Alfonso (2012)
 Antigonick, play by Anne Carson (2012) which is a free and poetic adaptation of the Sophocles play. Carson and her colleagues presented a reading of Antigonick in 2012 at the Louisiana gallery in Denmark.
 Antigonas, linaje de hembras, play by Argentinean playwright Jorge Huertas
 Antigone, play by Theodora Voutsa (2016) at Compagnietheater in Amsterdam
 Antígona Oriental (2012) written by Marianela Morena and directed by Volker Lösch.
 Antigone (2016), a play by Slavoj Žižek which allows for three different endings (2016).
 Antigona (2016), a solo play by Brazilian actress Andrea Beltrão
 The Children of Jocasta (2017), a novel by Natalie Haynes which pays particular attention to Ismene, Antigone's sister. 
 Home Fire (2017), a novel by Kamilla Shamsie which adapts the story to present issues concerning the repatriation of the body of a terrorist.
 Antigone (2017), a film artwork by Tacita Dean
 Antigone in Molenbeek (2017) a play by Stefan Hertmans
 Antigone Alone (2018) a solo play by the actor/writer Michael McEvoy
 Antigone in Ferguson (2018) a play by the group Theater of War which offers commentary on the 2014 shooting of Michael Brown, presented as a reading of the play by the cast with a gospel choir acting as the chorus.
 Antigone (2019), a film by Sophie Deraspe
 Pale Sister (2021) Written by Colm Tóibín. Starring Lisa Dwan, directed by Sir Trevor Nunn.
 The Riot Act (1984) written by Tom Paulin, reimagining the play in the setting of Northern Ireland during the period of Margaret Thatcher's government. Produced by Field Day Theatre Co., Dublin.

Analysis
In the works of Hegel, in particular in his discussion of Sittlichkeit in his Phenomenology of Spirit and his Elements of the Philosophy of Right, Antigone is figured as exposing a tragic rift between the so-called feminine "Divine Law," which Antigone represents, and the "Human Law," represented by Creon. 
The Catholic philosopher Jacques Maritain considers Antigone as the "heroine of the natural law:"
she was aware of the fact that, in transgressing the human law and being crushed by it, she was obeying a higher commandment—that she was obeying laws that were unwritten, and that had their origin neither today nor yesterday, but which live always and forever, and no one knows where they have come from.
The psychoanalyst Jacques Lacan writes about the ethical dimension of Antigone in his Seminar VII, The Ethics of Psychoanalysis. Others who have written on Antigone include theorist Judith Butler, in her book Antigone's Claim, as well as philosopher Slavoj Žižek, in various works, including Interrogating the Real (Bloomsbury: London, 2005) and The Metastases of Enjoyment (Verso: London, 1994).

Contemporary productions
A new translation of Antigone into English by the Canadian poet Anne Carson has been used in a production of the play (March 2015) at the Barbican directed by Ivo van Hove and featuring Juliette Binoche as Antigone. This production was broadcast as a TV movie on April 26, 2015. The play was transferred to the BAM Harvey Theatre at the Brooklyn Academy of Music, running from September 24 to October 4, 2015.

References

Further reading

Antigones by George Steiner. An examination of the legacy of the myth and its treatment in Western art, literature, and thought in drama, poetry, prose, philosophic discourse, political tracts, opera, ballet, film, and even the plastic arts.
Antigone's Claim: Kinship Between Life and Death by Judith Butler. An examination of the figure of Antigone in literature and philosophy, particularly in Sophocles and in the work of Georg Wilhelm Friedrich Hegel, Luce Irigaray and Jacques Lacan.
Rayor, Diane J. (2011) Sophocles’ Antigone. Cambridge University Press. Translation with introduction and notes.
 Söderbäck, Fanny, ed. Feminist Readings of Antigone. New York: SUNY Press, 2010. . Including classical texts by Judith Butler, Bracha Ettinger, Julia Kristeva, Luce Irigaray and Adriana Cavarero.
 Wilmer, S. E., and Zukauskaite, Audrone, eds. Interrogating Antigone. Oxford: Oxford University Press, 2010. . Including recent texts by Judith Butler, Bracha L. Ettinger, Julia Kristeva and Luce Irigaray.

External links
 Antigone – a review of the Antigone myth and the various productions of her story 

Princesses in Greek mythology
Theban characters in Greek mythology
Suicides in Greek mythology